Wushan Station is a station on Line 3 of the Guangzhou Metro, which started operations on 30December 2006. It is located under the junction of Yuehan Road and Yuezhou Road in the Tianhe District of Guangzhou, adjacent to the South China Agricultural University.

Station layout

Exits

References

Railway stations in China opened in 2006
Guangzhou Metro stations in Tianhe District